AEC Armoured Command Vehicle was a series of command vehicles built by the British Associated Equipment Company (AEC) during the Second World War .

History

During the Second World War, the United Kingdom was the only country to develop and widely employ purpose-built armoured command vehicles. Those were essentially armoured buses based on truck chassis.

The most common ACV of the British Army was the AEC 4x4 ACV. The vehicle, based on AEC Matador chassis, entered production in 1941. A total of about 415 units were built. The vehicle was used for the first time in the North African Campaign and remained in service until the end of the war. Big and comfortable, it was nicknamed Dorchester by the troops, after the luxury hotel in London. Three ACVs of this type were captured by the German Afrika Korps. Two of them, named "Max" and "Moritz", were employed by Rommel and his staff throughout the campaign.

In 1944 a larger AEC 6x6 ACV was developed. The vehicle was based on AEC 0857 lorry chassis and was powered by the AEC 198 150 hp engine. The hull was welded from 9 mm thick rolled steel. The weight of the vehicle reached 17 tons. One hundred and fifty one units were built.

Both vehicles were built in two configurations, called LP (Low Power) and HP (High Power), with different radio equipment.

Some ACVs were  conversions of Armoured Demolition Vehicles which used the same bodywork.

Variants
High Power
One No. 19 wireless set, one R 107 High Frequency reception set. The No 19 set had a maximum output of 30 Watts and maximum range of 45 miles (72km).
Low Power body
two No 19 wireless sets. No 19 set with a maximum output of 30 watt and maximum range of 45 miles (72km) for communications with higher commands.

See also
Guy Lizard

Notes

References
Forty, George - World War Two Armoured Fighting Vehicles and Self-Propelled Artillery, Osprey Publishing 1996, .

External links

Aec.middx.net
Nase noviny
AFRIKAKORPS / AANA Research AEC Dorchester 4X4 or DAK "Mammoth"
 Max Rommels AEC "Dorchester" 4x4, Armoured Command Vehicle in African theatre

Armoured cars of the United Kingdom
World War II armoured cars
Command vehicles
AEC vehicles
World War II armoured fighting vehicles of the United Kingdom
Military vehicles introduced from 1940 to 1944